Steele Lake is a small sized lake in north central Alberta. Named for Ira John Steele, a soldier killed during World War I, the lake was originally named Cross Lake, for its distinctive shape, and lent that name to the surrounding Cross Lake Provincial Park.

Despite its small surface area, Steele Lake's local drainage basin is quite large, gathering water from the smaller September Lake, Frances Lake, Banana Lake, and other nondescript ponds and creeks. The lake feeds into the Athabasca River catchment area, eventually reaching the Arctic Ocean.

References

Atlas of Alberta Lakes

Lakes of Alberta
Municipal District of Lesser Slave River No. 124